James Lind  (4 October 1716 – 13 July 1794) was a Scottish doctor. He was a pioneer of naval hygiene in the Royal Navy. By conducting one of the first ever clinical trials, he developed the theory that citrus fruits cured scurvy.

Lind argued for the health benefits of better ventilation aboard naval ships, the improved cleanliness of sailors' bodies, clothing and bedding, and below-deck fumigation with sulphur and arsenic. He also proposed that fresh water could be obtained by distilling sea water. His work advanced the practice of preventive medicine and improved nutrition.

Early life
Lind was born in Edinburgh, Scotland, in 1716 into a family of merchants, then headed by his father, James Lind. He had an elder sister. He was educated at the High School in Edinburgh.

In 1731 he began his medical studies as an apprentice of George Langlands, a fellow of the Incorporation of Surgeons which preceded the Royal College of Surgeons of Edinburgh. In 1739, he entered the Navy as a surgeon's mate, serving in the Mediterranean, off the coast of West Africa and in the West Indies. Just after that patrol he left the Navy, wrote his MD thesis on venereal diseases and earned his degree from the University of Edinburgh Medical School, and was granted a licence to practise in Edinburgh.

Legacy

Prevention and cure of scurvy

Scurvy is a disease caused by a vitamin C deficiency, but in Lind's day, the concept of vitamins was unknown. Vitamin C is necessary for healthy connective tissue. In 1740 the catastrophic result of then-Commodore George Anson's circumnavigation attracted much attention in Europe; out of 1900 men, 1400 died, most of them allegedly from scurvy. According to Lind, scurvy caused more deaths in the British fleets than French and Spanish arms.

Since antiquity in some parts of the world, and since the 17th century in England, it had been known that citrus fruit had an antiscorbutic effect. John Woodall (1570–1643), an English military surgeon of the British East India Company recommended them but their use did not become widespread.  John Fryer (1650–1733) too noted in 1698 the value of citrus fruits in curing sailors of scurvy. Although Lind was not the first to suggest citrus as a cure for scurvy, he was the first to study its effect by a systematic experiment in 1747. It was one of the first reported, controlled, clinical experiments in history, particularly because of its use of control groups.

Lind thought that scurvy was due to putrefaction of the body that could be helped by acids, so he included an acidic dietary supplement in the experiment. This began after two months at sea when the ship was afflicted with scurvy. He divided twelve scorbutic sailors into six groups of two. They all received the same diet, but in addition group one was given a quart of cider daily, group two twenty-five drops of elixir of vitriol (sulfuric acid), group three six spoonfuls of vinegar, group four half a pint of seawater, group five two oranges and one lemon, and the last group a spicy paste plus a drink of barley water. The treatment of group five stopped after six days when they ran out of fruit, but by that time one sailor was fit for duty while the other had almost recovered. Apart from that, only group one showed any effect from its treatment.

Shortly after this experiment, Lind retired from the Navy and practised privately as a physician. In 1753, he published A treatise of the scurvy, that was mostly ignored. In 1758, he was appointed chief physician of the Royal Naval Hospital Haslar at Gosport. When James Cook went on his first voyage he carried wort (0.1 mg vitamin C per 100 g), sauerkraut (10–15 mg per 100 g) and a syrup, or "rob", of oranges and lemons (the juice contains 40–60 mg of vitamin C per 100 g) as antiscorbutics, but only the results of the trials on wort were published. In 1762 Lind's Essay on the most effectual means of preserving the health of seamen appeared. In it he recommended growing salad—i.e. watercress (43 mg vitamin C per 100 g)—on wet blankets. This was put into practice, and in the winter of 1775 the British Army in North America was supplied with mustard and cress seeds. However Lind, like most of the medical profession, believed that scurvy came from ill-digested and putrefying food within the body, bad water, excessive work, and living in a damp atmosphere that prevented healthful perspiration. Thus, while he recognised the benefits of citrus fruit (although he weakened the effect by switching to a boiled concentrated or "rob", the production of which destroys vitamin C), he never advocated citrus juice as a single solution. He believed that scurvy had multiple causes which therefore required multiple remedies.

The medical establishment ashore continued to believe that scurvy was a disease of putrefaction, curable by the administration of elixir of vitriol, infusions of wort and other remedies designed to 'ginger up' the system. It could not account for the effect of citrus fruits and so dismissed the evidence of them as unproven and anecdotal. In the Navy however, experience had convinced many officers and surgeons that citrus juices provided the answer to scurvy, even if the reason was unknown. On the insistence of senior officers, led by Rear Admiral Alan Gardner in 1794, lemon juice was issued on board the Suffolk on a twenty-three-week, non-stop voyage to India. The daily ration of two-thirds of an ounce mixed in grog contained just about the minimum daily intake of 10 mg vitamin C. There was no serious outbreak of scurvy. This resulted in widespread demand for lemon juice, backed by the Sick and Hurt Board whose numbers had recently been augmented by two practical naval surgeons who knew of Lind's experiments with citrus.  The following year, the Admiralty accepted the Board's recommendation that lemon juice be issued routinely to the whole fleet. Another Scot, Archibald Menzies, brought citrus plants to Kealakekua Bay in Hawaii on the Vancouver Expedition, to help the Navy re-supply in the Pacific.
This was not the end of scurvy in the Navy, as lemon juice was at first in such short supply that it could only be used in home waters under the direction of surgeons, rather than as a preventative. Only after 1800 did the supply increase so that, at the insistence of Admiral Lord St Vincent, it began to be issued generally.

Prevention of typhus

Lind noticed that typhus disappeared from the top floor of his hospital, where patients were bathed and given clean clothes and bedding. However, incidence was very high on the lower floors where such measures were not in place. Lind recommended that sailors be stripped, shaved, scrubbed, and issued clean clothes and bedding regularly. Thereafter, British seamen did not suffer from typhus, giving the British navy a significant advantage over the French.

Fresh water from the sea
In the 18th century ships took along water, cordial and milk in casks. According to the Regulations and Instructions relating to His Majesty's Service at Sea, which had been published in 1733 by the Admiralty, sailors were entitled to a gallon of weak beer daily (5/6 of a British gallon, equivalent to the modern American gallon or slightly more than three and a half litres). As the beer had been boiled in the brewing process, it was reasonably free from bacteria and lasted for months, unlike water. In the Mediterranean, wine was also issued, often fortified with brandy.

A frigate with 240 men, with stores for four months, carried more than one hundred tons of drinkable liquid. Water quality depended on its source, the condition of casks and for how long it had been kept. In normal times, sailors were not allowed to take any water away. When water was scarce, it was rationed and rain collected with spread sails. Fresh water was also obtained when possible en voyage, but watering places were often marshy, and in the tropics infested with malaria.

In 1759, Lind discovered that steam from heated salt water was fresh. He proposed to use solar energy for the distillation of water. But only when a new type of cooking stove was introduced in 1810 was production of fresh water by distillation possible on a useful scale.

Tropical disease
Lind's final work was published in 1768; the Essay on Diseases Incidental to Europeans in Hot Climates, with the Method of Preventing their fatal Consequences. It was a work on the symptoms and treatments of tropical disease, but was not specific to naval medicine and served more as a general text for doctors and British emigrants. The Essay was used as a medical text in Britain for fifty years following publication. Seven editions were printed, including two after Lind's death.

Family
Lind married Isabella Dickie and had two sons, John and James. In 1773 he was living on Princes Street in a brand new house facing Edinburgh Castle.

The elder son, John  (1751–1794), studied medicine at St Andrews University and graduated in 1777, then succeeded his father as chief physician at Haslar Hospital in 1783. James (1765–1823), also embarked on a career with the British navy. His cousin was James Lind (1736–1812).

James rose to the rank of post-captain, and was notable for his role in the Battle of Vizagapatam in 1804, for which he was knighted.

Death
Lind died at Gosport in Hampshire as a Knight Commander of the Order of the Bath, in 1794. He was buried in St Mary's Parish Churchyard in Portchester.

Recognition 

Lind's is one of twenty-three names on the Frieze of the London School of Hygiene and Tropical Medicine building in Keppel Street, London. Names were selected by a committee of unknown constitution who deemed them to be pioneers in public health and tropical medicine. At University of Edinburgh Medical School there is the James Lind commemorative plaque unveiled in 1953, funded by citrus growers of California and Arizona.  The James Lind Alliance is named after him.

References

External links

 James Lind Library (including biography and extracts from Lind's most important works)
 The Lind pages with reference to the Lind family in general including a family tree and other family documents
 James Lind Institute creates future bellwethers of clinical research industry and carries forward the legacy of James Lind

1716 births
1794 deaths
Medical doctors from Edinburgh
Vitamin C
18th-century Scottish medical doctors
Clinical research
Scottish surgeons
Founder Fellows of the Royal Society of Edinburgh
Members of the Philosophical Society of Edinburgh
Fellows of the Royal College of Physicians of Edinburgh
People educated at the Royal High School, Edinburgh
Alumni of the University of Edinburgh
Royal Navy Medical Service officers
Military personnel from Edinburgh